is a Japanese light novel series written by Sametarō Fukada and illustrated by Sakura Miwabe. It began as a web novel that started in the Shōsetsuka ni Narō website in August 2019. It was later acquired by Shufu to Seikatsu Sha, who have published three volumes since March 2020 under their PASH! Books imprint.

A manga adaptation illustrated by Ichiho Katsura has been serialized in the PASH UP! website since March 2020, with its chapters collected into five tankōbon volumes as of September 2022. An anime television series adaptation has been announced.

Media

Light novel
Written by Sametarō Fukada, the series began as a web novel that started in the Shōsetsuka ni Narō website on August 12, 2019. It was later acquired by Shufu to Seikatsu Sha, who began publishing the novels with illustrations by Sakura Miwabe on March 27, 2020. As of July 2021, three volumes have been released.

Manga
A manga adaptation illustrated by Ichiho Katsura began serialization in Shufu to Seikatsu Sha's PASH UP! website on March 26, 2020. The first tankōbon volume was released on October 30, 2020. As of September 2022, five volumes have been released.

During their panel at Anime NYC 2022, Kodansha USA announced that they licensed the manga adaptation for a Fall 2023 release.

Anime
In August 2022, it was announced that the novels would be adapted into an anime television series.

Reception
In 2021, the manga adaptation was nominated in the Next Manga Awards in the web manga category.

Notes

References

External links
  at Shōsetsuka ni Narō 
  
  
 

2020 Japanese novels
Anime and manga based on light novels
Fantasy anime and manga
Japanese fantasy novels
Japanese webcomics
Light novels
Light novels first published online
Seinen manga
Shōsetsuka ni Narō
Slice of life anime and manga
Upcoming anime television series
Webcomics in print